Fritillaria orientalis is a Eurasian species of monocotyledonous plant in the lily family Liliaceae. It was described by Johann Friedrich Adam in 1805, based on specimens collected in Ossetia.

This bulbous perennial flourishes on grass and brush in limestone valleys. The flowers, appearing in April and May, are purple, borne singly or in twos or threes.

The species grows in France, Italy, Greece, the Balkans, Austria, Moldova, Ukraine, southern Russia, Turkey, and the Caucasus.

Gallery

References

External links

Carpathian Basin, Fritillaria orientalis   photos
Calphotos, University of California @ Berkeley, Fritillaria orientalis  photo by Mike Ireland
Riserva Naturale della Val Rosandra, Fritillaria orientalis è nella Regione presente solo nella porzione sud orientale del Carso photo; captions in Italian

orientalis
Flora of Europe
Flora of Asia
Plants described in 1805